The Holy Trinity is a tempera painting created by  Spyridon Romas.  He was a Greek painter from Corfu.  He was a prominent member of the Heptanese School.  He was active from 1745 to 1786.  He traveled all over the world.  He painted in Corfu, Lecce, Livorno, and London.  According to the Hellenic Institute over 25 of his works survived.  He is one of the few Greek painters to completely adopt a new style of painting.  He traveled to London, England around 1770 and remained in the country until his death.  He painted several portraits but also maintained artwork in the region.  An iconostasis with most of his works is superlatively preserved in Livorno, Italy at the Museo della Città di Livorno (Museum of the City of Livorno).

The Trinity is an integral part of the Christian religion. There have been many interpretations and debates about the subject. The Trinity historically refers to the Father (God), Son (Jesus), and the Holy Spirit. Countless Greek and Italian painters adopted the subject. Masaccio painted an Italian version known as the Holy Trinity. It was a very popular theme. A notable Greek-style version of the subject was painted in Constantinople around the 1450s by a Greek master. The painting is part of the collection at the Cleveland Museum in the United States. Painters of the Cretan School and the Heptanese School adopted the theme. Notable versions were painted by Thomas Bathas, Michael Damaskinos, Elias Moskos and Emmanuel Tzanes. In Damaskino's Tribute to the Eucharist Jesus is sitting on a circular globe with an elaborate decorative motif. The globe and motif were also added to different versions of the Holy Trinity paintings. Roma's also added a similar sphere to his work.

Description
The materials used were tempera paint, gold leaf, and wood panel.  The height is	
117 cm (46.1 in.) and the width is 78 cm (30.7 in.).  Romas completed the work in 1764 for the Trinity Greek Orthodox church in Livorno, Italy.  The icon was part of the iconostasis of the destroyed church.  The church was torn down in 1942 because of a city rehabilitation project.  The works of art were moved to a museum.  The icon has evolved relative to its early predecessors.  The painting is in line with comparable works of the Heptanese School. Compared to the Bathas version the figures are more detailed.  The folds of fabric feature more realistic lines and grooves.  The artist used a refined method of light and shadow.  The sphere represents the earth.  A cross appears on top of the sphere.  Jesus is to our left he is performing the traditional sign of the cross.  With his other hand, he points to God.  His celestial robe is floating in a spaceless setting.  The painter used the traditional brilliant blue and red color.  Jesus's flesh tones and facial features exhibit a refined realism.  The God figure to our right relays wisdom a similar figure is present in Masaccio's Holy Trinity.  His hair and facial features are painted in detail.  His majestic celestial garment exhibits striations.  God holds a scroll is his left hand.  God's other hand rests on the globe.  Both figures are floating on angel heads and clouds.  Behind the two figures, the artist painted parts of the angelic seraphim.  The white dove symbolizing the Holy Spirit floats above both figures in front of a sunlike sphere.  An aura radiates from the Holy Spirit coating the entire gold background.  The traditional Greek symbols are featured around the father and son.

Gallery

References

Bibliography

18th-century paintings
Paintings of the Heptanese School
Paintings in Livorno